Lake Seminole is a reservoir located in the southwest corner of Georgia along its border with Florida, maintained by the U.S. Army Corps of Engineers. The Chattahoochee and Flint rivers join in the lake, before flowing from the Jim Woodruff Lock and Dam, which impounds the lake, as the Apalachicola River. The fish in Lake Seminole include largemouth bass, crappie, chain pickerel, catfish, striped bass and other species. American alligators, snakes and various waterfowl are also present in the lake, which is known for its goose hunting.

History
Authorized by the United States Congress in the Rivers and Harbors Act of 1946 as the Jim Woodruff Lock and Dam Project, construction began the following year. With the dam completed in 1952, in 1957 the lake was opened. The project was expected to cost $29 million USD, but when completed had required $46.5 million USD. The lake is named after the Seminole Indians.

Jim Woodruff Dam

The dam crosses the state line between Georgia and Florida, with the eastern end of the dam being located in Georgia and the majority, including the locks, gates, spillway, and powerhouse, all being within Florida, just 100 feet south of the southwest corner of Georgia.

Navigation

Parks
The U.S. Army Corps of Engineers maintains 10 parks along the shore of the lake, with 35 parks in total available for recreation, including five campgrounds.

San Carlos de los Chacatos
The West Bank Overlook at the western end of the dam is the location of the Spanish mission San Carlos de los Chacatos, established in 1674 following a revolt by the Chacato. Used by both Marcos Delgado and Don Laureano de Torres y Ayala on their expeditions, the mission was attacked by Alibamu warriors in 1696, then later by British forces led by Colonel James Moore during Queen Anne's War and abandoned.

Resettled during the Creek War in 1813 by Uchee refugees, the site was abandoned again in 1818 during the First Seminole War, and was not rediscovered until 1948 during archaeological work by the Florida Park Service supporting the construction of Lake Seminole.

Fort Scott
Fort Scott was built in 1816 on the west bank of the Flint River, just before it empties into the Apalachicola. The intent was to protect what was then the southern border of the United States (the border between Georgia and Florida), subject to various types of invaders operating through or out of Spanish territory. The Fort was abandoned after Florida became a U.S. territory in 1821 and there was no longer a border to defend. The area around the site was flooded due to the creation of the lake, thus the land which the fort resided became an island.

Notes 
Lake Seminole is known for its large bass fishing during the summer and duck hunting in the early winter. It has also been a location of preference for the well-renowned Bass Anglers Sportsman Society (B.A.S.S.) fishing tournaments.

References
Notes

Bibliography

External links

Official map
Jim Woodruff Dam
Shoreline of Florida's Pan-Handle, Jim Woodruff Lock and Dam
Lake Seminole Resources

ACF River Basin
Borders of Georgia (U.S. state)
Borders of Florida
Protected areas of Decatur County, Georgia
Protected areas of Gadsden County, Florida
Seminole
Protected areas of Jackson County, Florida
Seminole
Seminole
Seminole
Protected areas of Seminole County, Georgia
Seminole
Bodies of water of Decatur County, Georgia
1957 establishments in Florida
1957 establishments in Georgia (U.S. state)